The Acura Integra (DE) is a compact car (C-segment) manufactured by Honda under the Acura brand since 2022. It is a 5-door liftback based on the eleventh-generation Civic that replaced the ILX sedan.

The DE Integra was introduced in North America on June 2, 2022, for the 2023 model year, as Acura's entry level offering in the region. The model reuses the Integra nameplate which has been unused by either Honda or Acura outside China since 2006. The Integra nameplate is also used by Honda in China since 2021, as the twin model of the Civic produced by Guangqi Honda.

Overview 
On March 10, 2022, Acura unveiled the production version of the 2023 Integra. The design of the production Integra is nearly identical to the pre-production version, however, the yellow exterior color and exterior decals shown on the pre-production model would not be available on the production model. The interior of the production Integra shares several parts from the eleventh-generation Civic.

Unlike the previous Japanese-built models, it is produced in the United States at the Marysville Auto Plant in Marysville, Ohio instead.

The Integra is available in three trim levels: an unnamed base model, the mid-level A-Spec, and the top-tier A-Spec Technology Package. While all models offer a CVT, only the A-Spec Technology Package model offers a six-speed manual transmission with a limited-slip differential.

Pre-orders for the 2023 Integra opened on March 10, 2022, with the first 500 pre-orders also receiving a complimentary exclusive NFT of the vehicle.

Type S 
On December 5, 2022, Acura revealed new photos of an Integra Type S prototype being tested at Honda's research and development located in Tochigi, Japan. It will share internal key components with the FL5 Civic Type R, including the 2.0L turbocharged inline-4 engine and 6-speed manual transmission.

Awards 
The Integra won the North American Car of the Year award for 2023. It was also one of seven finalists for the 2023 Motor Trend Car of the Year award.

Marketing 
The Integra appeared in the Chiaki's Journey series of Acura Type-S commercials.

References

External links 

 

Integra
Cars introduced in 2022
Compact cars
Sedans
Front-wheel-drive vehicles
Vehicles with CVT transmission
Motor vehicles manufactured in the United States